European route E 602 is a European B class road in France, connecting the cities La Rochelle and Saintes.

Route 
 
 E03 E601 La Rochelle
 E603 Saintes

External links 
 UN Economic Commission for Europe: Overall Map of E-road Network (2007)
 International E-road network

Roads in France